The 2000 Tulsa Golden Hurricane football team represented the University of Tulsa as a member of the Western Athletic Conference (WAC) during the 2000 NCAA Division I-A football season. Led by first-year head coach Keith Burns, the Golden Hurricane compiled an overall record of 5–7 with a mark of 4–4 in conference play, placing fifth in the WASC. Tulsa played home games at Skelly Stadium in Tulsa, Oklahoma.

Schedule

References

Tulsa
Tulsa Golden Hurricane football seasons
Tulsa Golden Hurricane football